The Smith–Wilson method is a method for extrapolating forward rates. It is recommended by EIOPA to extrapolate interest rates. It was introduced in 2000 by A. Smith and T. Wilson for Bacon & Woodrow.

Mathematical formulation 
Let UFR be some ultimate forward rate and  be the time to the i'th maturity. Then  defines the price of a zero-coupon bond at time t.

Where

and the symmetric W matrix is

and
,
,
.

References 

 A Technical Note on the Smith-Wilson Method, The Financial Supervisory Authority of Norway, (1 July 2010)
 Lagerås, Andreas & Lindholm, Mathias. (2016). Issues with the Smith-Wilson method. Insurance: Mathematics and Economics. 71. 10.1016/j.insmatheco.2016.08.009. 
 Smith, A. and Wilson, T. (2000). Fitting Yield Curves with Long Term Constraints. Research report, Bacon & Woodrow.
 Technical documentation of the methodology to derive EIOPA's risk-free interest rate term structures

Financial models
Fixed income analysis
Insurance
Mathematical finance